Shirasawa may refer to:

Rikuzen-Shirasawa Station, JR East railway station located in Sendai, Miyagi Prefecture, Japan
Shirasawa, Fukushima, village located in Adachi District, Fukushima, Japan
Shirasawa, Gunma, village located in Tone District, Gunma, Japan
Shirasawa Junior High School in Shiraiwa, Motomiya, Fukushima, Japan
Shirasawa Keikoku Station, guided bus station in Moriyama-ku, Nagoya, Aichi Prefecture, Japan
Shirasawa Station (Akita), railway station on the JR East Ōu Main Line in Ōdate, Akita, Japan
Yasuyoshi Shirasawa (1868–1947), Japanese botanist at the University of Tokyo